Taranganba is a town and locality in the Livingstone Shire, Queensland, Australia.

Geography
Taranganba is set back from Keppel Bay on a low broad hill that overlooks Cooee Bay and Yeppoon.

Taranganba is often regarded as a suburb of the town of Yeppoon.  Like its neighbouring suburb Cooee Bay, Taranganba is separated from Yeppoon by Ross Creek.

The Scenic Highway (State Route 4) runs along the eastern boundary.

Taranganba is largely residential with most homes being built since the 1970s. Cedar Park at Taranganba is the central shopping district for the area, and travelling from Yeppoon, it is the last significant shopping precinct until Emu Park.

History
Taranganba State School opened on 1 February 1993.

Prior to the 2008 local government amalgamations, the Capricorn Coast was within the Shire of Livingstone. From 2008 to 2013, it was part of Rockhampton Region. The Shire of Livingstone was re-established in the 2014 local government de-amalgamations.

Education
Taranganba State School is a government primary (Prep-6) school for boys and girls at Taranganba Road. In 2015, the school had an enrolment of 670 students. In 2018, the school had an enrolment of 694 students with 47 teachers (41 full-time equivalent) and 37 non-teaching staff (22 full-time equivalent). It includes a special education program.

There are no secondary schools in Taranganba. The nearest government secondary school is Yeppoon State High School in neighbouring Yeppoon to the north.

Community
Taranganba is a steadily growing community. Several major land developments in Tarranganba and the neighbouring localities of Lammermoor and Taroomball are filling quickly with demand from the mining boom.

Many residents of Taranganba work in Rockhampton and live on the coast.

References

Towns in Queensland
Shire of Livingstone
Localities in Queensland